The Desert Inbetween (2011) is the collaborative album by ambient musicians Steve Roach and Brian Parnham, containing Southwest surroundings.

Reception 
AllMusic rated the album a 3.5 of 5, stating "The Desert Inbetween is almost a natural outgrowth of their individual approaches".

Hypnagogue highly rated the album, saying "It is a richly dimensional concatenation of purposeful sounds that ricochet in rhythm around each other to create the space as they go, every one  of them integral".

Track listing

Personnel 
Adapted from Discogs
 Michał Karcz – cover images
 Sam Rosenthal – graphic design
 Steve Roach – composer, arranger, recorder, producer, mastering, electric guitar, synthesizer, electronics, waterphone, sounds, ocarina, percussion
 Brian Parnham – composer, arranger, recorder, producer, synthesizer, didgeridoo, udu, shaker, sounds, engineer, bass guitar, percussion, other trace elements

References

External links 
 The Desert Inbetween at Bandcamp
 The Desert Inbetween at Discogs

2011 albums
Steve Roach (musician) albums
Projekt Records albums